"From the Music" is the third single from Australian band the Potbelleez's second album Destination Now. It was the highest-charting single from the album, peaking at number 16 in Australia and number 35 in New Zealand.

Track listing
iTunes EP
 "From the Music"  (Radio edit) – 3:10
 "From the Music" (Original Mix) – 6:03
 "From the Music" (Static Revenger Remix)  – 5:32
 "From the Music" (Sgt Slick Remix) – 6:17
 "From the Music" (Ryan Riback Remix) – 6:02
 "From the Music" (Hoxton Whores Remix)  – 7:18

Charts
"From the Music" debuted at number 35 on April 24, 2011 before peaking at number 16 on May 15, 2011.

Year-end charts

Certifications

Awards

ARIA Awards
The ARIA Awards are presented annually from 1987 by the Australian Recording Industry Association (ARIA). "From the Music" was nominated for one award.

|-
| 2011 || "From the Music" || Best Dance Release || 
|-

APRA Awards
The Australasian Performing Right Association have presented the APRA Awards annually from 1982. "From the Music" was nominated for two awards.

|-
| rowspan="2"| 2011 || "From The Music" || Dance Work of the Year  || 
|-
| "From the Music" || Most Played Australian Work  || 
|-

References

2011 singles
2011 songs
APRA Award winners
Songs written by Ilan Kidron